

Franz Heinrich Otto Sensfuß (21 June 1891 – 11 March 1976) was a German general during World War II. He was a recipient of the Knight's Cross of the Iron Cross on Nazi Germany.

Awards and decorations
 Iron Cross (1914) 2nd Class (18 September 1914) & 1st Class (20 November 1914)
 Clasp to the Iron Cross (1939) 2nd Class (1 October 1939) & 1st Class (22 April 1941)
 Knight's Cross of the Iron Cross with Oak Leaves
 Knight's Cross on 22 August 1944 as Generalleutnant and commander of the 212. Infantrie-Division
Towards the end of the war, Sensfuß was nominated for the Oak Leaves; the nomination was received by the Heerespersonalamt (HPA—Army Staff Office) from the troop on 14 March 1945. Major Joachim Domaschk requested by teleprinter message the advisory opinion from the Commander-in-Chief of AOK 1 and Heeresgruppe B. The 212. Volksgrenadier-Division at the time was being encircled by US forces in the vicinity of Baumholder and went into captivity. Major Domaschk had sent a radio message to the nominating commander of the LXXX. Armeekorps: "Nomination deferred according to AHA 44 Ziff. 572." Domaschk noted on the nomination: "Deferred, because missing in action!" A presentation was never made. Sensfuß is not listed in the book for the "nominations for the higher grades of the Knight's Cross of the Iron Cross" nor in the nomination book for Knight's Cross (starting with Nr. 5100).

References

Citations

Bibliography

 
 
 

1891 births
1976 deaths
Lieutenant generals of the German Army (Wehrmacht)
German Army personnel of World War I
Recipients of the Knight's Cross of the Iron Cross with Oak Leaves
People from Elbląg County
German Army generals of World War II
Recipients of the Iron Cross (1914), 1st class